Kadono (written: 角野 or 上遠野) is a Japanese surname. Notable people with the surname include:

, Japanese writer
Kadono Takuzo, Japanese actor who appeared in Summer Snow
, Japanese writer
, Japanese snowboarder
, Japanese water polo player

Japanese-language surnames